Wild Gals of the Naked West is a 1962 nudie-cutie Western film written and directed by Russ Meyer and starring Sammy Gilbert, Anthony-James Ryan, Jackie Moran, Terri Taylor, Frank Bolger, and Werner Kirsch. The film is one of the few porn flicks  in the American Western movie genre.

Plot
An old geezer recalls some of the antics of the men and women of his western town, more wild and woolly than Tombstone or Dodge City. In this town no one is a good shot, the women are hungry for new meat, and practical jokers abound. A stranger strolls into town, proving resistant to the mayhem, and after donning some cowboy duds begins cleaning up that town.

Cast
Sammy Gilbert as The Stranger
Anthony-James Ryan as Crazy Redskin
Jackie Moran		
Terri Taylor as Golden Nuggets 
Frank Bolger as Snake Wolf
Werner Kirsch as Snick	
Julie Williams as The Bosom

Reception
According to Roger Ebert, the film was "an ambitious attempt at comedy and satire. It is one of Meyer's personal favorites, but did badly at the box-office because, he now believes, he paid too much attention to the humor and not enough to the sex, and was over-cautious in assigning pasties to his actresses."

See also
 List of American films of 1962

References

External links
 
Complete film at Internet Archive
 MEYER MONTH – Russ Meyer’s ‘Wild Gals of the Naked West’ (1962)

1962 films
American pornographic films
American Western (genre) films
1962 Western (genre) films
1960s pornographic films
1960s English-language films
Films directed by Russ Meyer
1960s American films